"Cracker Island" is a song by British virtual band Gorillaz, featuring American bassist, singer and songwriter Thundercat. The track was released on 22 June 2022 as the first single from their eighth studio album, Cracker Island. "Cracker Island" peaked at number two on the US Billboard alternative airplay chart, making it their highest charting song since "Feel Good Inc."

Background 
Damon Albarn stated that the song is about the idea that "people have kind of some mad ideas can all kind of live together happily in their own kind of echo chamber". "Cracker Island" was one of the five new songs that were performed live during their 2022 World Tour, before their official release, with the others songs being "Silent Running," "New Gold," "Skinny Ape," and "Possession Island".

Music video 
The animated music video, directed by Jamie Hewlett and Fx Goby, features the fictional bandmembers 2-D, Russel, and Noodle at the Los Angeles County Hospital on a rainy night. 2-D and Noodle are being questioned by the police while 2-D is seemingly hallucinating visions of Thundercat. In the middle of a dimly lit hallway, a white bed sheet with two eyeholes inexplicably rises. The sheet hovers as it slowly moves towards the main lobby. As it moves, an unknown slimy liquid can be seen left in its tracks. Meanwhile, a seemingly catatonic Russel stares at a TV, which is shown with a breaking news report regarding a "major incident below the Hollywood Sign," stating that the police "intervene[d] to stop [an] occult ceremony". Russel suddenly snaps out of his mesmerized state with a pink tint in his eyes and moves towards the others in the lobby. Just then, Murdoc arrives at the hospital in an occult robe and with a sinister smile. The other people in the lobby watch as the bed sheet ghost finally makes its way to the lobby and slowly towards Murdoc, who holds his hands out ready for an embrace. The sheet is removed to reveal a young lady underneath, who quickly ages into an elderly woman. Murdoc places his hand on her cheek endearingly before moving in for a kiss while the other people watch in shock and confusion.

Personnel 
Gorillaz
 Damon Albarn – vocals, synthesizers, production
 Remi Kabaka Jr. – production
 Jamie Hewlett – artwork, character design, video direction

Additional musicians and personnel
 Thundercat – vocals, bass
 Greg Kurstin – synthesizers, drums, keyboards, percussion, engineering, production
 Samuel Egglenton – engineering
 Julian Burg – engineering
 Matt Tuggle – engineering
 Mark "Spike" Stent – mixing
 Matt Wolach – mixing assistance
 Randy Merrill – mastering

Charts

References 

2022 songs
2022 singles
Gorillaz songs
Songs written by Damon Albarn
Songs written by Thundercat (musician)
Songs written by Greg Kurstin
Song recordings produced by Greg Kurstin
Parlophone singles
Warner Records singles
British funk songs
British synth-pop songs
British disco songs